The Aegean Sea website, commonly known as Aiqinhai and based in Hangzhou, China, was an ideological and humanistic website that preached freedom and democracy. The website was founded on May 20, 2001 by Zhang Jianhong, who also served as its editor-in-chief, and with poet Bei Dao as general advisor, and was closed on March 9, 2006. 

Aegean Sea boasted itself as "The Last Clean Paradise of Chinese Literatures".

Shut down
On March 9, 2006,  Aegean Sea was shut down by the Zhejiang authorities for allegedly publishing news in violation of Internet regulations.

References 

Defunct websites
Internet censorship
Internet properties established in 2001
Internet properties disestablished in 2006